Wan'an County is a county in the southwest of Jiangxi province, People's Republic of China. It is under the jurisdiction of the prefecture-level city of Ji'an.

Administrative divisions
Wan'an County has 9 towns and 7 townships. 
9 towns

7 townships

Demographics 

Climate

Notes and references

External links
  [www.wanan.gov.cn/ Government site] - 

County-level divisions of Jiangxi